In category theory, a discipline within mathematics, the notion of lax functor between bicategories generalizes that of functors between categories.

Let C,D be bicategories. We denote composition in diagrammatic order. A lax functor P from C to D, denoted , consists of the following data:
 for each object x in C, an object ;
 for each pair of objects x,y ∈ C a functor on morphism-categories, ;
 for each object x∈C, a 2-morphism  in D;
 for each triple of objects, x,y,z ∈C, a 2-morphism  in D that is natural in f: x→y and g: y→z.
These must satisfy three commutative diagrams, which record the interaction between left unity, right unity, and associativity between C and D. See http://ncatlab.org/nlab/show/pseudofunctor.

Category theory